Deudorix antalus, the brown playboy, is a butterfly of the family Lycaenidae. It is found in Africa (including Madagascar) and south-west Arabia.

The wingspan is 22–34 mm for males and 22–40 mm for females. Adults are on wing year-round with peaks from September to October and from March to May.

The larvae feed on the fruit of a wide range of plants, including Haplocoelum galiense, Schotia species (including S. afra and Schotia speciosa), Faidherbia albida, Syzygium species (including S. guineense), Ximenia species (including X. caffra, X. poppae), Acacia species (including A. stenocarpa), Prunus species (including Prunus persica ispahanensis), Cassia, Phaseolus lunatus, Sutherlandia, Crotalaria, Dolichos, Nymania capensis, Combretum, Quisqualis, Albizia, Baphia, Bauhinia, Burkea, Caesalpinia, Cajanus, Canavalia, Phaseolus, Pisum, Vigna, Macadamia, Olea, Paphia, Cardiospermum and Capsicum species.

References

External links
Die Gross-Schmetterlinge der Erde 13: Die Afrikanischen Tagfalter. Plate XIII 66 e

Butterflies described in 1855
Deudorix